Prince Heinrich of Bavaria (24 June 1884 – 8 November 1916) was a member of the Bavarian Royal House of Wittelsbach and a highly decorated Army officer in the First World War.

Early life

Heinrich was born in Munich, Kingdom of Bavaria. He was the only child of Prince Arnulf of Bavaria and his wife Princess Therese of Liechtenstein.

Heinrich was brought up in Munich, where one of his tutors was Joseph Gebhard Himmler, the father of Heinrich Himmler. The elder Himmler was an ardent royalist who, following the birth of his second son, petitioned the prince to allow him to be named after him - Heinrich. The prince agreed and also became Heinrich Himmler's godfather. "{H}e took a lively interest in the progress of his godson and in how the Himmlers were faring. It was a warm relationship, as is shown by the preserved correspondence between Gebhard and the prince; at Christmas the Himmlers regularly received a visit from the prince and his mother..."

Military career and death

At the age of 17, following his Abitur, Heinrich joined the Bavarian army with the rank of Leutnant. Initially, he served with the Royal Bavarian Infanterie-Leib-Regiment, but later was reassigned the 1st Royal Bavarian Heavy Cavalry “Prince Charles of Bavaria”.

After the outbreak of World War I, the regiment saw action on the Western front, where Prince Heinrich was badly wounded. Upon recovering, he returned to his old infantry regiment and in June 1915, was promoted to Major. At the same time, he was put in charge of the III. Battalion of the newly established Deutsches Alpenkorps stationed in the Carnic Alps. In late 1916, the battalion was transferred to Romania where it fought at Turnu Roşu Pass. On 7 November 1916, during operations in the area near Poiana Spinului, while conducting a personal reconnaissance of the front line, he was shot and killed by Romanian soldiers. His last words reportedly were, "Noblesse oblige. I do not mean that with respect to my family but rather my duty as an officer."

Heinrich's body was transported back to Munich, where he was buried by his father’s side at the Theatinerkirche. On 6 March 1917, for his exceptional bravery, he was awarded the Knight's Cross of the Military Order of Max Joseph. He had previously been awarded the Iron Cross (1914), 1st class for actions in June 1916.

Honours

He received the following orders and decorations:
 :
 Knight of St. Hubert
 Jubilee Medal for the Bavarian Army
 Knight of the Military Order of Max Joseph, 6 March 1917
    Ernestine duchies: Grand Cross of the Saxe-Ernestine House Order
 : Grand Cross of the Royal Military Order of Our Lord Jesus Christ
 :
 Knight of the Black Eagle
 Iron Cross (1914), 1st and 2nd Classes, June 1916
 :
 Grand Cross of the Order of Charles III
 Novice Knight of the Order of Montesa

Ancestry

References
 
 
 Jirí Louda and Michael MacLagan, Lines of Succession: Heraldry of the Royal Families of Europe, 2nd edition (London, U.K.: Little, Brown and Company, 1999)

Footnotes

1884 births
1916 deaths
Princes of Bavaria
House of Wittelsbach
Members of the Bavarian Reichsrat
Knights of the Military Order of Max Joseph
Recipients of the Iron Cross (1914), 1st class
Recipients of the Iron Cross (1914), 2nd class
German military personnel killed in World War I
People from the Kingdom of Bavaria
Military personnel of Bavaria
Burials at the Theatine Church, Munich
Knights of the Order of Montesa
Deaths by firearm in Romania
Grand Crosses of the Order of Saint Stephen of Hungary
Grand Crosses of the Order of Christ (Portugal)
German Army personnel of World War I